Lescott is a surname. Notable people with the surname include:

Aaron Lescott (born 1978), English footballer
Joleon Lescott (born 1982), English footballer, brother of Aaron

See also
 Lescot